The Villa Rebar is a ruinous mansion from World War II located on Medvednica mountain, near Zagreb. It was first built in 1932, and would become the home of Croatian dictator, Ante Pavelić. During World War II, Pavelić led the Independent State of Croatia (NDH), a puppet government that was loyal to Fascist Italy and Nazi Germany. During his reign, he made the Villa Rebar his home. While living there, Pavelić had a system of tunnels built that connected the manor to military bunkers in the nearby hills, as well as some that acted as escape tunnels.

After the war, Pavelić fled, and the villa was eventually remodeled and turned into a mountain resort called "Risnjak". The final blow to the estate would be a fire in 1979 that all but razed the manor to its stone foundations. after this disaster, the property, along with its tunnels, were simply abandoned.

The above ground foundations of the home remain to this day, overgrown and marred with graffiti. Urban explorers have also taken to tagging up the tunnels beneath the estate. However, exploring the tunnels beneath the ruins of Pavelić's former mansion is not recommended.

References

External links 
Villa Rebar

Buildings and structures in Zagreb
Independent State of Croatia
Buildings and structures completed in 1932